Partington railway station was situated on the Cheshire Lines Committee route between Warrington and Stockport. It served the locality between 1874 and 1964.

History

The line between Skelton West Junction and Cressington Junction was opened for goods traffic on 1 March 1873, with passenger trains beginning on 1 August 1873. The first station named Partington was opened on that line in May 1874.

A new line, parallel to the old but slightly to the south-west, was built on embankments formed using the soil excavated from the new canal; it included the new Cadishead Viaduct. The new line was brought into use for goods traffic on 27 February 1893; a new Partington station was built on that line, and passenger traffic was transferred from the old line to the new on 29 May 1893, in plenty of time for the opening of the Ship Canal on 1 January 1894.

The second station was closed on 30 November 1964.

Routes

Notes

References

External links
 Partington station on navigable 1946 O. S. map

Former Cheshire Lines Committee stations
Disused railway stations in Trafford
Railway stations in Great Britain opened in 1874
Railway stations in Great Britain closed in 1893
Railway stations in Great Britain opened in 1893
Railway stations in Great Britain closed in 1964
Beeching closures in England